The CONMEBOL Libertadores Femenina, commonly known as "Copa Libertadores Femenina" (Portuguese: Copa Libertadores Feminina or Taça Libertadores Feminina) is an annual international women's association football club competition in South America. It is organized by the South American Football Confederation (CONMEBOL). The competition started in the 2009 season in response to the increased interest in women's football. It is the only CONMEBOL club competition for women.

The tournament is the women's version of the Copa Libertadores, which is organized since 1960.

Since 2019, clubs in the men's Libertadores have been required to have a women's team: failure to do so means their entry will be rejected. This change was made in order to strengthen the women's competition.

History
The competition was officially announced in March 2009, and it was approved by CONMEBOL's Executive Committee on July 3 of that year. CONMEBOL decided that the competition's first edition will be played in Santos and Guarujá, Brazil from October 3 to October 18, 2009. The competition was organized by CONMEBOL, FPF, CBF and Santos Futebol Clube.

Format

In 2009 and 2010 the tournament was played by ten teams, one from each CONMEBOL country, divided in two groups of five clubs each. The two best-placed teams of each group qualify to play the semifinal and the winners then play the final, while the losers play the third-place game.

From 2011 to 2018 twelve teams played the tournament and were divided into three groups of four. The group winners and best runner-up advanced to the semi-finals.

The 2015 edition was the first to be held outside Brazil. Medellin in Colombia have made an official bid, with cities in Paraguay, Chile and again Brazil interested as well. Medellin was then announced host just before the 2014 edition.

From 2019 the tournament was expanded from 12 to 16 teams.

Results

Notes

Performances

By club

Performance by nation
After the 2021 edition. So far only Peruvian teams have not reached a semi-final.

Notes

Top scorers
Seven players have won the award twice Cristiane, Gloria Villamayor, Catalina Usme, Maitté Zamorano, Oriana Altuve, Ysaura Viso and Victória. Viso and Victória did it with the same club.

See also
FIFA Women's Club World Cup
AFC Women's Club Championship
WAFF Women's Clubs Championship
CAF Women's Champions League
UEFA Women's Champions League

References

External links
 
 Women's Copa Libertadores at the RSSSF

 
CONMEBOL club competitions
Women's association football competitions in South America
Recurring sporting events established in 2009
Multi-national professional sports leagues